Hot oil may refer to:

 Chili oil, a condiment made from vegetable oil
 Boiling oil or hot oil, an early thermal weapon
 Oil produced in violation of production restrictions established pursuant to the NIRA, see National Industrial Recovery Act#Legacy

 Panama Refining Co. v. Ryan, the "Hot Oil case", a 1935 United States Supreme Court case
 Connally Hot Oil Act of 1935
 Hot oil manicure

See also
 Oil (disambiguation)